This is a list of Unix daemons that are found on various Unix-like operating systems. Unix daemons typically have a name ending with a d.

See also
List of Unix commands

References

Unix
Unix daemons